Grevillea dilatata is a species of plant in the protea family that is endemic to Australia. It is native to south-eastern South Australia, including Kangaroo Island as well as the Eyre and Yorke Peninsulas.

References

dilatata
Proteales of Australia
Endemic flora of Australia
Flora of South Australia
Plants described in 1830
Flora of Kangaroo Island